Dalzell is an unincorporated community in Washington County, in the U.S. state of Ohio.

History
Dalzell was laid out in 1871, and named for Private Dalzell. A post office called Dalzell was established in 1872, and remained in operation until 1919.

References

Unincorporated communities in Washington County, Ohio
Unincorporated communities in Ohio